Love Love Love is the debut studio album by South Korean singer-songwriter Roy Kim, released and distributed on June 25, 2013 through CJ E&M Music. The album features nine tracks in total, and spawned two hit singles: the million-selling hit "Bom Bom Bom" and the lead single under the same title. Due to the album's success, Kim earned a Mnet Asian Music Award for Best New Male Artist, and a Golden Disk Award for New Rising Star Award in Disk Album. As of July 2016, Love Love Love has sold over 19,000 physical copies and 2.94 million individual track downloads in Kim's native country (see Roy Kim discography).

Background
Shortly after winning Mnet's talent competition series Superstar K4, it was announced that Kim was preparing to release a mini album in spring 2013. However, those plans were scrapped in favor of releasing Kim's first single "Bom Bom Bom" followed by a full-length album. Upon the release of "Bom Bom Bom" in April 2013, he began recording the rest of the album. In June of that year, it was announced by CJ E&M Music that the artist was in the final stages of preparing for the album.

Release and promotion
On June 18, 2013, a week before the release of Love Love Love, the album's track listing was revealed, along with a teaser image. In the days leading up to the release, several more teasers were released, including the making-of videos of the recording process and a music video teaser.

Following the release of the album, Kim appeared on Mnet's music television program M! Countdown (June 27, 2013), where he performed "Let Me Love You" and the album's title track. He continued to promote the album on various music shows through July of that year.

Reception
The album's pre-release single "Bom Bom Bom" topped the Gaon Digital Chart for two consecutive weeks, and the now-defunct Billboard Korea K-Pop Hot 100 for three straight weeks, respectively. At the end of 2013, the song was ranked at number seven (2.9%) in the top ten of Gallup Korea's "Song of the Year", tied with Im Chang-jung's "A Guy like Me" and 4Minute's "What's Your Name?". According to the Gaon Music Chart, it was the fourth most successful single of 2013, selling over 1.5 million digital copies that year. The song also was at number seven on the 2013 year-end Billboard Korea K-Pop Hot 100.

Upon release, Love Love Love debuted at number three on the Gaon Weekly Album Chart, while its title track reached number two on the Gaon Digital Chart, and number four on the Billboard Korea K-Pop Hot 100. "Love Love Love" became the 104th most successful single of 2013, selling over 732,000 digital copies that year. As of July 2016, the album has sold about 19,900 copies in Kim's native country.

Track listing
English titles are adapted from the iTunes Store, and credits from Naver Music.

Additional notes:
 "Intro (My Forest)" was recorded at Roy Forest built by Kim's fans to celebrate his album release. The forest is located near Guryong Station in Gaepo-dong, Gangnam-gu, Seoul.

Credits and personnel
Credits are adapted from the album's liner notes.

Locations

 Recorded at Roy Forest 
 Recorded at CJes studio 
 Recorded at T Studio 
 Recorded at Booming Studio 
 Recorded at Seoul Studio 
 Recorded at ShinShack Studio, Nashville, TN 
 Recorded at Little Big Sound, Nashville, TN 
 Mixed at Musicabal 
 Mixed at CJes Studio 
 Mastered at Metropolis Mastering, London

Personnel

 Sang-woo Kim – vocals , composer , arranger , acoustic guitar , lyrics , backing vocals 
 Ji-chan Jung – recording , composer , arranger , acoustic guitar , electric guitar , keyboard , percussion , lyrics , ukulele , bass , rhodes , music producer
 Young-kyung Bae – composer 
 Hyun-jung Go – mixing 
 Dan Needham – drum , percussion 
 Hoon Choi – bass 
 Hyun-seok Kim – keyboard , piano , arranger , music co-producer
 Jung-hwan Kim – banjo , acoustic guitar 
 Tae-woo Kang – backing vocals 
 Hyung Choi – mixing 
 Hyun-woo Eom – recording 
 Hyun-in Jung – recording 
 Seong-yoon Kim – arranger 
 Seok-chul Shin – drum 
 Seong-shik Jeon – contrabass 
 Jun-ho Hong – electric guitar 
 Ah-ra Cho – violin 
 Yang-soo Noh – recording 
 Pyung-wook Lee – recording 
 John Gatchings – cello 
 Ken Lewis – percussion 
 CJ E&M – executive producer
 Ja-hoon Gu – mixing assistant engineer
 Mi-young Gu – mixing assistant engineer
 Kyung-joon Lee – mixing assistant engineer
 Bobby Shin – recording of drum, percussion, and cello, Nashville production
 David Donghwa Han – assistant engineer, production assistant
 Stuart Hawkes – mastering

Charts and sales

Weekly charts

Monthly charts

Year-end charts

Sales

Awards and nominations

Annual music awards

Music program awards

Covers and usage in media
 In August 2013, singer Park Jae-jung covered "Love Love Love" on Superstar K5, which he was later crowned the winner.
 In August 2014, "Love Love Love" was featured in a commercial for the mobile music application, KakaoMusic.
 On November 12, 2014, Thai singer Natthew released a remake of "Don't Know How", which was Kim's first song ever to be covered.
 On March 2, 2016, singer-songwriter Bily Acoustie covered "Bom Bom Bom" through his live performance on MBC's radio show Park Jung-ah's .
 In April 2016, "Bom Bom Bom" was featured on advertisements for KT Corporation's "Y24 Mobile Plan".
 On April 12, 2016, boy band KNK covered "Bom Bom Bom" through their live performance on SBS MTV's music television program The Show.

Release history

See also
 List of Korea K-Pop Hot 100 number-one singles
 List of number-one hits of 2013 (South Korea)

Footnotes

References

External links
 
 
 
 Roy Kim's official website 

2013 albums
Roy Kim albums
Stone Music Entertainment albums
Korean-language albums
Warner Music Group albums